The Baht River is a watercourse in Morocco that is tributary to the Sebou River. Also known as the Oued Beht, this river rises in the Middle Atlas mountain range.
The river is impounded by the El Kansera irrigation dam about 20 kilometres (12 mi) south of Sidi Slimane.

Natural history
In the upper parts of the watershed within the Middle Atlas is the prehistoric range of the endangered primate Barbary macaque, which animal prehistorically had a much larger range in North Africa.

See also
 Ouergha River

Line notes

References
 C. Michael Hogan. 2008. Barbary Macaque: Macaca sylvanus, GlobalTwitcher.com, ed. N. Stromberg
 Mohammed Hammam, Jāmiʻat Muḥammad al-Khāmis. Kullīyat al-Ādāb wa-al-ʻUlūm al-Insānīyah. 1995. L'Occident musulman et l'occident chrétien au moyen âge, 525 pages  page 160 [French]

Rivers of Morocco